Surobi may refer to:

 Surobi, Kabul, a town and district centre in Kabul Province, Afghanistan
 Surobi District (Kabul), a district in Kabul Province, Afghanistan
 Surobi, Nangarhar, a community in Nangarhar Province, Afghanistan
 Surobi District (Paktika), a district in Paktika Province, Afghanistan
 Surobi, Paktika, a district center in Paktika Province, Afghanistan